Gustav Rydahl (born September 11, 1994) is a Swedish professional ice hockey centre for the Colorado Eagles of the American Hockey League (AHL) while under contract with the Colorado Avalanche of the National Hockey League (NHL).

Playing career
Rydahl played in the youth ranks with Färjestads BK before moving to Frölunda HC in 2011. He made his Elitserien debut on October 9, 2012, at Timrå IK. He scored his first Elitserien goal on January 12, 2013, against HV71's Gustaf Wesslau in a 3–4 shootout loss in Scandinavium.

Rydahl signed with the Växjö Lakers in 2014 and helped the team win the Swedish championship his first year, making 62 SHL appearances with five goals that season. After two years with the Lakers, he agreed to terms with fellow SHL outfit Luleå HF in May 2016.

Having claimed the Swedish championship with Färjestad BK in the 2021–22 season, Rydahl left the SHL as a free agent and was signed to a one-year, $750,000 contract with the New York Rangers of the NHL on June 13, 2022.

Rydahl started the 2022–23 season with the Rangers' American Hockey League affiliate, the Hartford Wolf Pack, but was called up to the Rangers on January 5, 2023. He did not play in the Rangers' January 5 game and was returned to Hartford afterward. Rydahl contributed with seven goals and 15 points through 40 games with the Wolf Pack before he was traded by the Rangers to the Colorado Avalanche in exchange for forward Anton Blidh on March 3.

Career statistics

Regular season and playoffs

International

Awards and honors

References

External links

 

1994 births
Living people
Colorado Eagles players
Frölunda HC players
Färjestad BK players
Hartford Wolf Pack players
Ice hockey players at the 2022 Winter Olympics
Luleå HF players
Mora IK players
Olympic ice hockey players of Sweden
Sportspeople from Karlstad
Swedish ice hockey centres
Växjö Lakers players